The Goole by-election of 27 May 1971 was held after the death of Labour Member of Parliament (MP) George Jeger. The seat was retained by Labour.

Results

References

Goole by-election
Goole by-election
Goole by-election
Elections in the East Riding of Yorkshire
Goole
By-elections to the Parliament of the United Kingdom in Yorkshire and the Humber constituencies
1970s in the East Riding of Yorkshire